Thomas Richard Marsh (1961–2022) was a highly regarded astronomer and astrophysicist working in the field for four decades, recently specialising in the accretion and evolution of binary star systems.

He was awarded the Herschel Medal in 2018 for his development of doppler tomography which he used to study compact binary stars.

International and public engagement 
Thomas Marsh worked to bring astronomy to less affluent countries and maintained a strong link with Thailand. This enabled astronomers there to use his high-speed cameras and be part of these international endeavours. He was also happy to engage with the public and share his enthusiasm for the cosmos in radio and TV interviews as well as on stage at a Warwick Christmas Lecture. Indeed, one of Marsh’s high-profile papers resulted from an initial observation by an amateur astronomer that he followed up.

While visiting La Silla Observatory in Chile, he went missing on 16 September 2022 and his body was found in the Atacama Desert on 10 November 2022.

References

External links
 BBC News – Professor Tom Marsh explains the supermoon of November 2016

1961 births
2022 deaths
20th-century astronomers
21st-century astronomers
Academics of the University of Warwick
Alumni of the University of Cambridge
British astronomers
People educated at St Paul's School, London
People from Old Windsor